Keith Anthony Greene (5 January 1938 – 8 March 2021) was a British racing driver from England.

Prior to Formula One, Greene had a successful career in sportscars. In 1956 using a Cooper T39 he competed in 11 national level races finishing outside the top six on only one occasion, with two wins and three other podium finishes.

After retiring from driving, Greene became a team manager in Formula 5000 and sports car racing. He worked for Hexagon of Highgate in London running their newly formed motorcycle business in the mid 1970s. At that time he also managed Alain de Cadenet's Le Mans racing team. He died from cardiac arrest on 8 March 2021 at the age of 83.

Racing record

Complete Formula One World Championship results
(key)

‡ At the 1962 British Grand Prix, Greene drove the Lotus 18 entered by John Dalton in practice only. The car was driven in the race by Tony Shelly.

Complete British Saloon Car Championship results
(key) (Races in bold indicate pole position; races in italics indicate fastest lap.)

References

English racing drivers
English Formula One drivers
1938 births
2021 deaths
24 Hours of Le Mans drivers
Cooper Formula One drivers
Gilby Engineering Formula One drivers
World Sportscar Championship drivers